Alireza Ghaleh Nasseri is an Iranian Paralympic athlete. He represented Iran at the 2016 Summer Paralympics held in Rio de Janeiro, Brazil and he won the silver medal in the men's discus throw F56 event.

In 2017, he won two medals at the Islamic Solidarity Games held in Baku, Azerbaijan: the silver medal in the men's shot put F56 event and the silver medal in the men's discus throw F56 event.

At the 2018 Asian Para Games held in Jakarta, Indonesia, he won the gold medal in the men's discus throw F54/55/56 event.

References

External links 
 

Living people
Year of birth missing (living people)
Place of birth missing (living people)
Athletes (track and field) at the 2016 Summer Paralympics
Medalists at the 2016 Summer Paralympics
Paralympic silver medalists for Iran
Paralympic medalists in athletics (track and field)
Paralympic athletes of Iran
Iranian male discus throwers
Iranian male shot putters
21st-century Iranian people
Wheelchair discus throwers
Paralympic discus throwers
Medalists at the 2018 Asian Para Games